Begleit-Bataillon Reichsführer-SS was formed in May 1941 from Himmler's personal escort.  The Begleit-Bataillon fought on the eastern front during Operation Barbarossa. Further, when SS-Brigadeführer Wilhelm Mohnke formed Kampfgruppe Mohnke (Battle Group Mohnke) during the Battle of Berlin it was made up in part by 600 men from this battalion.

Notes

Composition

Composition – May 1941:

Schützen Kompanie 
Schützen Kompanie  
Schützen Kompanie 
Maschinen Gewehr Kompanie 
Infantrie Geschütz Kompanie
Panzerjäger Kompanie
Sturmgeschütz Kompanie
leichte Flak Batterie [2.0 cm]
schwere Flak Batterie [8.8 cm]

Lineage
Begleit-Bataillon Reichsführer-SS May 1941 - Feb 1943) 
Sturmbrigade Reichsführer SS (Feb 1943 - Oct 1943) 
16th SS Panzergrenadier Division Reichsführer-SS (Oct 1943 - May 1945)

Military units and formations of the Waffen-SS
Heinrich Himmler
Battalions of Germany
Military units and formations established in 1941
Military units and formations disestablished in 1945